Behram Khel is a town and union council of Lakki Marwat District in Khyber Pakhtunkhwa province of Pakistan. It is located at 32°34'16N 70°34'27E and has an altitude of 341 metres (1122 feet).

References

 
{{Coord|32|34|16|N|70|34|27|E|display=masharan of behram khel and tari khel
malak sardaraz khan tari khel 03469510368

[[Category:Lakki marwat
Union councils of Lakki Marwat District
Populated places in Lakki Marwat District